Zhao Minggang (born 30 May 1988) is a Chinese boxer. He competed in the men's middleweight event at the 2016 Summer Olympics.

References

External links
 

1988 births
Living people
People from Hebei
Sportspeople from Hebei
People from Xingtai
Chinese male boxers
Olympic boxers of China
Boxers at the 2016 Summer Olympics
Middleweight boxers